Face First is a compilation of songs recorded by the rock band Masque between 1985 and 1988. The songs were officially recorded for two major record companies but never released until 2008. All songs were recorded during the height of the band's popularity as a local Hollywood live act.

Track listing
"Face First" - 2:38
"Sweet Revenge" - 3:38
"Wrap Your Arms Around Me" - 3:15
"Sweet Thing'" - 3:36
"Shame" - 3:02
"Walk Tight" - 3:46
"Lover Lover" - 3:44
"Boulevard of Broken Dreams" - 3:44
"Don't Take My Heart" - 3:51
"Reckless Actions" - 3:56
"Feelin Fine" - 2:34

Credits
 Tony Kelly - vocals
 Dale Fine -  guitar
 Bruff Brigham -  bass
 Ross Cristao - drums
 Kevin James - guitar
 John Haro - drums

References

2008 debut albums